T. Dwight "Slip" Stuessy (June 15, 1906 – February 12, 1957) was an American football and basketball coach and college athletics administrator. He served two stints as the head football coach at Macalester College in Saint Paul, Minnesota, from 1937 to 1938 and 1946 to 1956, compiling a record of 45–49–7. Stuessy also had two stints as the head basketball coach at Macalester, from 1937 to 1939 and 1946 until his death in early 1957. In between his two runs as Macalester, he was the head basketball coach at the College of William & Mary in Williamsburg, Virginia, from 1939 to 1943. He led the William & Mary Tribe to a 54–39 overall record and a 28–16 mark in Southern Conference play during his four seasons as coach.

A native of Woodstock, Illinois, Stuessy played college football at the University of Illinois at Urbana–Champaign as quarterback from 
1926 to 1928 under head coach Robert Zuppke. He was a member of the 1927 Illinois Fighting Illini football team, which was recognized as a national champion. Stuessy died of a heart attack on February 12, 1957, after coaching a basketball game at the College of St. Thomas in Saint Paul, Minnesota.

Personal Life

T Dwight Stuessy married Nancy Roberson in Durham, NC. Nancy Roberson was a graduate of Duke University when they were married. Dwight and Nancy had two children, Nancy Helen (Mansergh) and Dwight (Pepper) Stuessy. After T Dwight Stuessy's death, his wife Nancy Stuessy remarried widower Arthur Partridge. T Dwight and Nancy Stuessy together had 6 grandchildren: Julie Mansergh Maas, Gordon Mansergh, Gary Mansergh, John Mansergh, Allison Stuessy Dennis, and Garrett Stuessy.

Head coaching record

College football

References

External links
 

1906 births
1957 deaths
American football quarterbacks
American men's basketball coaches
Basketball coaches from Illinois
Coaches of American football from Illinois
High school basketball coaches in North Carolina
High school football coaches in North Carolina
Illinois Fighting Illini football players
Macalester Scots athletic directors
Macalester Scots football coaches
Macalester Scots men's basketball coaches
People from Woodstock, Illinois
Players of American football from Illinois
Sportspeople from the Chicago metropolitan area
William & Mary Tribe football coaches
William & Mary Tribe men's basketball coaches